D-Boy may refer to:
A nickname for Delta Force operators
Danny Rodriguez (1967–1990), alias D-Boy Rodriguez, Christian rap artist
"Dope boy", slang term for drug dealer
Drumma Boy, an American rapper and record producer
D-Boys, a young male actors group based in Tokyo, Japan, under the management of Watanabe Entertainment
D-boy, a name used by Korean rapper Suga
An alternative name of Digital Boy, an Italian DJ and MC